Broccolini is an Italian surname that may refer to

 Lidia Broccolino (born Lidia Broccolini in 1958), Italian film, television and stage actress

Similar names 
 Signor Brocolini, the stage name of the opera singer and actor John Clark (1841–1906).

See also 
 Broccolini, a vegetable

Italian-language surnames